Circumduction may refer to:

 Circumduction (anatomy), the circular movement of a limb
 Circumduction (rhetoric), an ambiguous or roundabout figure of speech